Znob-Novhorodske is an urban-type settlement in Shostka Raion of Sumy Oblast in Ukraine. It is located on the left bank of the Znobivka, a left tributary of the Desna, in the north of the oblast, close to the Russian border. in the drainage basin of the Dnieper. Znob-Novhorodske hosts the administration of Znob-Novhorodske settlement hromada, one of the hromadas of Ukraine. Population: 

Until 18 July 2020, Znob-Novhorodske belonged to Seredyna-Buda Raion. The raion was abolished in July 2020 as part of the administrative reform of Ukraine, which reduced the number of raions of Sumy Oblast to five. The area of Seredyna-Buda Raion was merged into Shostka Raion.

Economy

Transportation
The settlement is connected by road with Shostka and Seredyna-Buda.

References

Urban-type settlements in Shostka Raion